Alexandre Garcia may refer to:

 Alexandre Cardoso Garcia (born 1992), Brazilian football midfielder
 Alexandre Garcia (footballer) (born 1988), French football forward
 Alexandre Garcia (journalist), Brazilian broadcaster for Bom Dia Brasil and Jornal Nacional
 Alexandre García (judoka) (born 1972), Brazilian Olympic judoka
 Alexandre Garcia Ribeiro (born 1984), Brazilian football striker

See also
 Alex García (disambiguation)